The Early Jurassic Epoch (in chronostratigraphy corresponding to the Lower Jurassic Series) is the earliest of three epochs of the Jurassic Period. The Early Jurassic starts immediately after the Triassic-Jurassic extinction event, 201.3 Ma (million years ago), and ends at the start of the Middle Jurassic 174.1 Ma.

Certain rocks of marine origin of this age in Europe are called "Lias" and that name was used for the period, as well, in 19th-century geology. In southern Germany rocks of this age are called Black Jurassic.

Origin of the name Lias
There are two possible origins for the name Lias: the first reason is it was taken by a geologist from an English quarryman's dialect pronunciation of the word "layers"; secondly, sloops from north Cornish ports such as Bude would sail across the Bristol Channel to the Vale of Glamorgan to load up with rock from coastal limestone quarries (lias limestone from South Wales was used throughout North Devon/North Cornwall as it contains calcium carbonate to fertilise the poor quality Devonian soils of the West Country); the Cornish would pronounce the layers of limestone as '' or ''; leac  is Gaelic for "flat stone".

Geology

Stratigraphy

There has been some debate over the actual base of the Hettangian Stage, and so of the Jurassic System itself. Biostratigraphically, the first appearance of psiloceratid ammonites has been used; but this depends on relatively complete ammonite faunas being present, a problem that makes correlation between sections in different parts of the world difficult. If this biostratigraphical indicator is used, then technically the Lias Group—a lithostratigraphical division—spans the Jurassic / Triassic boundary.

United Kingdom

There are extensive Liassic outcrops around the coast of the United Kingdom, in particular in Glamorgan, North Yorkshire and Dorset. The 'Jurassic Coast' of Dorset is often associated with the pioneering work of Mary Anning of Lyme Regis. The facies of the Lower Jurassic in this area are predominantly of clays, thin limestones and siltstones, deposited under fully marine conditions.

Lias Group strata form imposing cliffs on the Vale of Glamorgan coast, in southern Wales.

Life

Ammonites
During this period, ammonoids, which had almost died out at the end-of-Triassic extinction, radiated out into a huge diversity of new forms with complex suture patterns (the ammonites proper).  Ammonites evolved so rapidly, and their shells are so often preserved, that they serve as important zone fossils.  There were several distinct waves of ammonite evolution in Europe alone.

Marine reptiles
The Early Jurassic was an important time in the evolution of the marine reptiles.  The Hettangian saw the already existing Rhaetian ichthyosaurs and plesiosaurs continuing to flourish, while at the same time a number of new types of these marine reptiles appeared, such as Ichthyosaurus and Temnodontosaurus among the ichthyosaurs, and Eurycleidus, Macroplata, and Rhomaleosaurus among the plesiosaurs (all Rhomaleosauridae, although as currently defined this group is probably paraphyletic).  All these plesiosaurs had medium-sized necks and large heads.  In the Toarcian, at the end of the Early Jurassic, the thalattosuchians (marine "crocodiles") appeared, as did new genera of ichthyosaurs (Stenopterygius, Eurhinosaurus, and the persistently primitive Suevoleviathan) and plesiosaurs (the elasmosaurs (long-necked) Microcleidus and Occitanosaurus, and the pliosaur Hauffiosaurus).

Terrestrial animals
 
On land, a number of new types of dinosaurs—the heterodontosaurids, scelidosaurs, stegosaurs, and tetanurans—appeared, and joined those groups like the coelophysoids, prosauropods and the sauropods that had continued over from the Triassic. Accompanying them as small carnivores were the sphenosuchian and protosuchid crocodilians.  In the air, new types of pterosaurs replaced those that had died out at the end of the Triassic. But in the undergrowth were various types of early mammals, as well as tritylodont synapsids, lizard-like sphenodonts, and early lissamphibians.

See also

 Late Triassic
 Toarcian turnover

References

Sources
 Davies, A. M., An Introduction to Palaeontology, Thomas Murby & Co., London
 House, M.R. (1993) Geology of The Dorset Coast, The Geologists' Association.
 Simms, M.J., Chidlaw, N., Morton, N. and Page, K.N. (2004) British Lower Jurassic Stratigraphy, Geological Conservation Review Series, No. 30, Joint Nature Conservation Committee, Peterborough.

External links
 Early Jurassic Period – The Lias epoch. Palaeos – overall presentation.
 Lecture 12 – Early Jurassic. Informative lecture notes by Dr. Paul Olsen.

 
Geological epochs
Jurassic geochronology